Frenchman's Cove may refer to several geographical places.

Australia

 The old name of La Perouse, New South Wales, a suburb of Sydney.

Canada

 Frenchman's Cove, Newfoundland and Labrador, a town on Burin Peninsula, Canada.
 Frenchman's Cove Provincial Park, on Burin Peninsula in Newfoundland and Labrador, Canada.
 a community in Humber Arm South, Newfoundland and Labrador, Canada.
Jamaica
 Frenchman's Cove Resort, Jamaica.